Otterburn Hall and Tower may refer to:

 Otterburn Hall, built c. 1870
 Otterburn Tower, built c. 1086, and again c. 1830